South Wonston is a village on the outskirts of the City of Winchester district of Hampshire, England. The population of the parish of South Wonston was estimated in 2017 to be 2,870.

Governance 
South Wonston is part of the Wonston and Micheldever ward which elects three councillors to Winchester City Council, as well as the wider Winchester Downlands ward which elects a single councillor to Hampshire County Council.

Education
South Wonston Primary School is situated in the centre of the village on Downs Road. Attached to the school is the church of St Margaret's, which the school uses for functions. The village does not have its own secondary schools, but the majority of pupils continue onto Henry Beaufort School, in Harestock.

Medical services
There is a surgery located on Downs Road that is run as a branch surgery of the Gratton Surgery, Sutton Scotney. Gratton Surgery Website There is a prescription collection service provided by the Village Stores.

Recreation ground
The recreation ground is situated to the south east of the village. In the car park of the recreation ground there is a recycling centre for plastics, glass and clothes. There are two football pitches, a tarmac tennis court, a pavilion, a bike track, skate park, a newly renovated multi-purpose basketball court  (lacking nets for some strange reason), the chalk pit (chalkies) and a play park. The car park is accessed from West Hill Road South.

South Wonston Swifts FC
The local football teams play their home games at the recreation ground. The club has various age groups ranging from U8 to U18 and senior level, playing in local leagues in the Hampshire area.

The Senior team were recently promoted to the Hampshire Premier Division and now play at the highest level the village's team has ever played. The senior team reserves play in the Andover & District division.

Local business
There is a village shop and post office in the centre of the village opposite the school.

Facilities
The village does not have a pub, but there is a licensed social club, well-appointed and selling a good range of draught and keg ales together with a full range of spirits. The club offers functions on most weekends and the usual activities of cribbage, darts and pool.  The club can also be used for special functions by arrangement.

There is also a village hall, where many local clubs and societies are based. The hall is also available for hire for private functions.

References

External links
 South Wonston information website
 South Wonston School website
 South Wonston Parish Council website
 www.geograph.org.uk : Photographs of South Wonston and surrounding area
 South Wonston Swifts Football Club website
 South Wonston Social Club website
 South Wonston Stores & Post Office website

Villages in Hampshire